Paranigilgia bushii is a moth in the family Brachodidae. It was described by Yutaka Arita in 1980. It is found on the Ryukyu Islands of Japan and in Taiwan.

References

Arctiidae genus list at Butterflies and Moths of the World of the Natural History Museum

Brachodidae
Moths described in 1980